Zoriana Stepanivna Skaletska ((); born 9 August 1980) is a Ukrainian lawyer, activist and politician and former Minister of Healthcare of Ukraine.

Biography 
Skaletska graduated from the National University of Kyiv-Mohyla Academy (2002). She studied at the Maria Curie-Skłodowska University (2002–2006). Doctor of Law.

Skaletska taught law at the National University of Kyiv-Mohyla Academy.

Skaletska is an expert in the Reanimation Reform Package organization. She was also an expert at the Center for Support of Reforms under the Cabinet of Ministers. Skaletska is the director of the public organization "Health Forum" and a member of the World Association of Medical Law.

On 29 August 2019, Skaletska was appointed as the Minister of Healthcare of Ukraine in the Honcharuk Government. According to Ukrayinska Pravda, President Volodymyr Zelensky continued to hold interviews with candidates for Minister of Healthcare on 29 August 2019, the same 
day the Honcharuk Government was appointed with Skaletska being appointed Minister of Healthcare. On 31 August 2019, Servant of the People faction leader Davyd Arakhamia stated on  that most likely (Healthcare Minister) Skaletska, would be replaced by Mykhailo Radutskyi (who according to Arakhamia needed "about three months to prepare" for the post).

On 4 March 2020 the Honcharuk Government was replaced by the Shmyhal Government in which Illia Yemets replaced Skaletska as Minister of Healthcare.

Skaletska is a candidate (number 10 on the election list) for the Kyiv City Council of the party Servant of the People in the 2020 Kyiv local election set for 25 October 2020.

References

External links 
 
 Ministry of Healthcare (in Ukrainian)

1980 births
Living people
Lawyers from Lviv
National University of Kyiv-Mohyla Academy alumni
Maria Curie-Skłodowska University alumni
Academic staff of the National University of Kyiv-Mohyla Academy
Ukrainian women lawyers
21st-century Ukrainian lawyers
Ukrainian women activists
Healthcare ministers of Ukraine
Women government ministers of Ukraine
21st-century Ukrainian women politicians
21st-century Ukrainian politicians
21st-century women lawyers
Politicians from Lviv